Kurt Kläber (1897–1959), who published under the pseudonym Kurt Held, was a writer and Communist displaced from Germany during the Second World War.

Early life 
Kläber left school at the age of 14 and began training as a locksmith and later trained to be a mechanic at Zeiss. He joined the Wandervogelbewegung and traveled through many countries of Europe. World War I broke out and put an end to his travels.
In 1914 he joined the German Army and fought in World War I, where he was wounded and contracted typhoid fever.

Politics 
Upon returning from the war he joined the Communist Party of Germany (KPD) and the Spartakusbund. He participated in armed uprisings in Halle, Hamburg and Berlin as well as in the strike against the Kapp-Putsch.
He earned his living as a traveling book salesmen for the Thüringen Ministry of Culture, specializing in political literature: social critical lyrics, as well as novels depicting the hardships of the working class. He published his first volume of workers poetry “Neue Saat” (new seed) in 1919.
In 1923 he traveled to the USA and spent a year touring, giving lectures and studying the situation of workers in the USA. His experiences in the USA became his first novel written in 1923, which wasn't published until 1927 “Passagiere der III. Klasse” (Third Class Passengers).
Back in Germany in 1924 he married the writer and professional storyteller Lisa Tetzner. Together they traveled promoting communist literature. In addition to writing, giving lectures and editing magazines and books Kläber also worked in mines near Köln, as well as other jobs to aid his understanding of the working class laborers. He joined the Bund proletarisch-revolutionäre Schriftsteller (the Association of Proletarian-Revolutionary Authors) and was one of the publishers of the journal regularly sent to their members, Linkskurve. Kläber gained a reputation as a leading authority on Communist literature.
As a known opponent of Nazism, he was arrested the day after the Reichstag fire and incarcerated. With the help of his wife, he was soon released from prison and sent into exile over Austria to Carona in Ticino in neutral Switzerland.

In 1938 he left the KPD as a reaction to the Stalinist orientated party line.

Literary career 
With the encouragement of his wife, Lisa, Kläber devoted himself to writing. The conditions of his exile prohibited him from publishing under his own name, so he adopted the pseudonym Kurt Held. He saw children as the true victims of war, class struggle and injustice. His books portrayed children realistically and conveyed messages of morality.
His greatest success "The Outsiders of Oskoken Castle" was soon followed by similar books about working class children:  “Der Trommler von Faido” (The Drummer of Faido), “Matthias und seine Freunde” (Matthias and his Friends) and the four volume series “Giuseppe und Maria”.

Death 
He died in exile on 9 December 1959 in Sorengo, Switzerland from the consequences of the typhoid fever he contracted in World War I.

Books
Neue Saat poetry Jena: Volksbuchhandlung, 1919
Empörer! Empor! Stories, Sketches and Travel Reports. Berlin: Verlag Der Syndikalist, 1925
Revolutionäre. Erzählungen aus den Kämpfen des Proletariats 1918–1925: Leipzig: Roter-Türmer-Verlag, 1925
Barrikaden an der Ruhr novel 1925
Passagiere der 3. Klasse novel Berlin: Internationaler Arbeiter-Verlag, 1927
Die Toten von Pabjanice narrations Moskau: Verlagsgenossenschaft ausländ. Arbeiter in der UdSSR, 1936
Die rote Zora und ihre Bande (The Outsiders of Oskoken Castle) Aarau: Sauerländer, 1941
Der Trommler von Faido Historical tales of Levantina. 2 Bde. Aarau: Sauerländer, 1947 / 1949
Matthias und seine Freunde Aarau. Sauerländer, 1950
Spuk in Neuhausen Berlin: Weiss, 1951
Alles für zwanzig Rappen The experiences of a small rebel Aarau: Sauerländer, 1951
Giuseppe und Maria 4 volumes Aarau: Sauerländer, 1955–56 (A Journey to Naples, of smugglers, mercenaries and soldiers, the children's city, the process)
Mein Bruder Georg Gütersloh: Rufer-Verlag, 1955

Sources 

https://web.archive.org/web/20191023105744/http://www.buchstart.ch/de/autoren/Held_Kurt/214.html
https://web.archive.org/web/20110510020002/http://www.mdr.de/geschichte-mitteldeutschlands/reise/personen/132251.html

External links 

 

1897 births
1959 deaths
Communist Party of Germany
Communist writers
Jewish-German families
German children's writers
German resistance members
Communists in the German Resistance
German male writers